The Type L6 ship is a United States Maritime Administration (MARAD) designation for World War II as a Great Lakes dry break bulk cargo ship. The L-Type Great Lakes Dry Bulk Cargo Ships were built in 1943 to carry much-needed iron ore from the upper Great Lakes to the steel and iron production facilities on Lakes Erie and Ontario in support of the war effort. The ships have a 15,675 tonne deadweight tonnage. The L6 ships were built by two companies: American Ship Building Company, in the case of the type L6-S-A1 models, of which 6 were built; and Great Lakes Engineering Works, Ashtabula, Ohio/ Great Lakes Engineering Works, River Rouge, Ohio, in the case of the type L6-S-B1, which produced 10 ships. Steel supply needed for World War was great. To supply iron ore from Lake Superior to steel foundries, the United States Commission had a series of L6 Lakers ship built. The Maritime Commission ordered ten Great Lakes Bulk Carriers of the L6-S-B1 type. The L6-S-B1 was design with a 3-cylinder triple expansion steam engines. The L6-S-A1 used a lentz 4-cylinder compound engine. All L6 ships were coal burning and delivered between May and November 1943. L6-S-B1 was built for the US Maritime Commission under USMC contract MCc-1834 in 1943 at the River Rouge yard. Each L6 ship cost $2.265 million. The first L6-S-B1 was the SS Adirondack/Richard J. Reiss, hull 290, keel was laid on March 9, 1942 and launched on September 19, 1942. The ships are often called the Class Lake Bulk Freighter now.

Specifications
Dimensions: 620 feet
Beam 60 feet
GRT 9057
NRT 6793 
Dwt 15,800
Two coal-fired water tube boilers.
L6-S-A1 type had Lenz 4 cylinder compound steam engine
L6-S-B1 type had a 2,500 shp, 3 cylinder triple expansion steam engine

Ships in Class
L6-S-A1 Maritimer class
Thomas Wilson      Hull #826	USMC #565, Sank in Sank 1987.
Sewell Avery       Hull #827	USMC #566 Used as a dock at Sault Ste Marie,Ont. 1987
J. Burton Ayers, renamed Cuyahoga       Hull#828 USMC #567 Converted Diesel 3,084 bhp in 1999
E. G. Grace, renamed Lincolnshire     Hull #829	USMC #568, Scrapped 1984 at Port Colborne Ont. 
Belle Isle, renamed Champlain Hull #1009	USMC #569 Scrapped in Turkey October 1987
John T. Hutchinson   Hull #1010	USMC #570 Scrapped in Taiwan Oct 2, 1988

L6-S-B1 Maritimer class
Adirondack, renamed Richard J. Reiss, then Manistee Hull #290 USMC #579 Converted to 2,950 horsepower diesel engine in 1976
Lake Angelina, renamed Cadillac Hull #291	USMC #580 Scrap in 1962 at Hamilton Ont.
Hill Annex , renamed George A. Sloan then Mississagi	Hull #292	USMC #581 Converted in 1984 to 4,500 bhp 12-cylinder diesel engine 
Pilot Knob, renamed Frank Armstrong Hull #522	USMC #582 Scrapped in Turkey 1988.
Clarence B. Randall	        Hull #523	USMC #583 Scrapped in Taiwan Oct 2, 1988
McIntyre, renamed Frank Purnell	Hull #293	USMC #584 Used as barge, now laid up on the Calumet River.
Robert C. Stanley   	        Hull #294	USMC # 585 Scrapped in Turkey May,1989.
' "Lehigh," renamed "Joseph X. Robert," then "Willowglen," scrapped in 2006.

Active
Ship still active on the lakes:
Cuyahoga (former: J. Burton Ayers), New diesel engine install in 2000.
Mississagi (former Hill Annex / George A. Sloan) Mississagi since 2001 (Self Discharging Bulk Carrier)

Notable incidents
SS Thomas Wilson After worked on the Lakes from 1943 to 1987. She was sold for scrap to Corostel Trading Co. of Montreal, Que. Canada in September 1987. Tugs were towing her to Taiwan for scrapping. On December 21, 1987 they hit a storm in the Atlantic Ocean and the towline broke. The Thomas Wilson sank 250 miles northeast of Bermuda, sank near 34 08'N by 61 35'12"W.
 SS Sewell Avery was sold 1986 to A. B. McLean Ltd., she was sunk in May 1987 to be used as part of a dock at Sault Ste. Marie, Ontario.
J. Burton Ayers grounded at Stoneport, MI resulting on September 10, 1980, with much bottom damage, she was repaired. She was also grounded in the Detroit River, near the Renaissance Center, on May 8, 1981; she was released by three tugs.

See also
 SS Edmund Fitzgerald
 Victory ships
 Liberty ship
 Type C1 ship
 Type C2 ship
 Type C3 ship
 United States Merchant Marine Academy
 List of auxiliaries of the United States Navy

References 

Merchant ships of the United States
World War II merchant ships of the United States
Ship types
Container ship classes
Ship classes
+